North Middletown is the name of the following places in the United States of America:

North Middletown, Kentucky
North Middletown, New Jersey